Pseudaethomerus is a genus of beetles in the family Cerambycidae, containing the following species:

 Pseudaethomerus lacordairei (Bates, 1862)
 Pseudaethomerus maximus Tippmann, 1953

References

Acanthoderini